Frank Brady (born 1948- died 27 October 2009) was an Irish football player who played as a centre half. He was the brother of Liam Brady.

Brady was born in Dublin. After initially playing for Stella Maris 
, he joined Shamrock Rovers in July 1967 from Home Farm F.C. He made his debut in a friendly against Everton at Dalymount Park on 4 August 1967. He made his competitive debut in Dundalk F.C. on 20 August 1967 in the League of Ireland Shield.

An ex-youth international he twice played in the European Cup Winners' Cup for Rovers against Randers FC.  He also played professionally in Australia.

After his return home he rejoined Home Farm in 1978 where he played for six seasons in the League of Ireland

Personal life
He was married to Margaret and had two sons Liam and Eamonn.

Honours
FAI Cup: 1
  Shamrock Rovers - 1968
Blaxnit Cup
  Shamrock Rovers 1967-68

References

Sources
 The Hoops by Paul Doolan and Robert Goggins

1948 births
2009 deaths
Association footballers from County Dublin
Republic of Ireland association footballers
Shamrock Rovers F.C. players
League of Ireland players
Home Farm F.C. players
Deaths from cancer in the Republic of Ireland
Stella Maris F.C. players
Association footballers not categorized by position
Frank